The Making of Moo is a play by Nigel Dennis satirizing religion. It was first performed by the English Stage Company at the Royal Court Theatre on 25 June 1957, and starred George Devine, John Osborne, John Moffatt and Joan Plowright. The play was directed by Tony Richardson, the set and costumes were designed by Audrey Cruddas and the music was by Thomas Eastwood. The first London revival of The Making of Moo was staged at the Orange Tree Theatre in November 2009.

Summary
The play is set in a British colony where a hydroelectric dam is being built. As a result of the dam's construction the natives believe that their local river god has been killed. In order to placate them, the engineer, his wife and his assistant create a new religion based around an invented deity, Moo, with themselves taking on the role of priests.

List of characters
(With original cast)
 Ist Native (Anthony Creighton)
 2nd Native/Mr Fosdick (Robert Stephens)
 3rd Native/Walter (John Wood)
 Constable (James Villiers)
 Donald Blake (John Osborne)
 Elizabeth Compton (Joan Plowright)
 Fairbrother (John Moffatt)
 Frederick Compton (George Devine)
 Sergeant (Nicholas Brady)
 William (Martin Miller)
 Willis (Stephen Dartnell)

1957 plays